{{DISPLAYTITLE:C22H24Br2N10O2}}
The molecular formula C22H24Br2N10O2 (molar mass: 620.310 g/mol) may refer to:

 Ageliferin
 Sceptrin

Molecular formulas